Ya Terminé is the seventh album by the Mexican singer Patricia Manterola.

Track listing

References

2010 albums
Patricia Manterola albums